Michael Petkovic (born 16 July 1976) is an Australian former goalkeeper.

Club career
 
Petkovic is of Croatian origin and is the brother of former Perth Glory goalkeeper Jason Petkovic.

South Melbourne 
Petkovic started off his career with South Melbourne in the NSL as a 19-year-old. As the second choice to youth product Dean Anastasiadis, Petkovic was relegated to cup games for game time. Petkovic however took advantage of his limited opportunities and produced numerous man of the match performances in South Melbourne's successful NSL Cup run in the 1995/96 Season. Following this season, Petkovic would reclaim the number 1 spot and establish himself as one of Australia's finest goalkeepers as he earned half of his Socceroos caps during his time at South Melbourne.

Petkovic would form a key role under Ange Postecoglou's all-conquering South side as they went on to win back-to-back Championships in 1997/1998 and 1998/1999. 

Petkovic was awarded the NSL goalkeeper of the year title in 1999, 2001 and 2002 and was awarded the Theo Marmaras medal in 1999 which is given to the best player in that season for South Melbourne. His performances for the club led him to be voted by an expert panel as the starting goalkeeper in South Melbourne's team of the century in 2002.

Overall during his 2-stints at the Hellas, Petkovic played 172 times keeping 54 clean sheets.

Later career 
In 1999, he moved to French side RC Strasbourg but didn't play a single league game and in 2000 he moved back to his old team South Melbourne. During his 2nd stint with the club, he moved on loan to Lillestrøm SK, a Norwegian club. In 2002, he moved to Turkish Super Lig side Trabzonspor and played 87 games for the club but left the club in 2005. He moved to Sivasspor and played 129 league games there and even managed to score a goal with the club. In 2010, he left the club to join A League side Melbourne Victory. He played over 25 games in his first a league season and looked to stay there for the next campaign. He looked to be 2nd choice goalkeeper for the next campaign as Perth Glory goalkeeper Tando Velaphi joined the Melbourne Victory. He announced his retirement from football shortly after the end of Melbourne Victory's Asian Champions League campaign.

International career
Petkovic's most notable appearance for his national side was when he kept goal in his team's world record breaking 31–0 win over American Samoa. He has had a total of six caps for Australia.

Career statistics

International

Honours

Individual 

 South Melbourne FC Team of the Century
 NSL Goalkeeper of the year: 1999, 2001, 2002
 Theo Marmaras Medal: 1999

South Melbourne FC 

 NSL Championship: 1998/1999, 1997/1998  
 NSL Cup: 1996 

Trabzonspor
Turkish Cup: 2002–03, 2003–04

References

External links
 Melbourne Victory profile
 Sivasspor profile
 FFA – Socceroo profile 
 OzFootball profile
 Interview with Four Diegos
 Petkovic Flies High in Turkey on The Age

1976 births
Living people
Soccer players from Perth, Western Australia
Australian soccer players
Australia international soccer players
Australian expatriate soccer players
Footballers at the 1996 Summer Olympics
Olympic soccer players of Australia
2005 FIFA Confederations Cup players
2007 AFC Asian Cup players
South Melbourne FC players
Trabzonspor footballers
Sivasspor footballers
RC Strasbourg Alsace players
Lillestrøm SK players
Melbourne Victory FC players
Expatriate footballers in France
Expatriate footballers in Turkey
Expatriate footballers in Norway
Australian people of Croatian descent
Süper Lig players
National Soccer League (Australia) players
Association football goalkeepers